The 23rd Air Division is an inactive United States Air Force intermediate echelon command and control organization.  It was last assigned to First Air Force, Tactical Air Command (ADTAC).   It was inactivated on 1 July 1987 at Tyndall Air Force Base, Florida.

History

The Division was activated at Duluth International Airport in November 1969, replacing the 29th Air Division in an Aerospace Defense Command (ADCOM) realignment and re-organization of assets.   Assigned additional designations of 23rd CONAD Region and 23rd NORAD Region upon activation with reporting to the NORAD Combat Operations Center at the Cheyenne Mountain Complex, Colorado.

The 23rd AD was responsible for the air defense of a large area of the upper Midwest south of the 97th meridian west, bordered by the southern boundary of the Canada–United States border to the Ohio/Pennsylvania border; south and west along the western ridge of the Appalachian Mountains to the 38th parallel north.  This encompassed most of Minnesota, Iowa, Northern Missouri, Wisconsin, Illinois, Indiana, Ohio and all of Michigan.  It was also the command organization for the Semi Automatic Ground Environment (SAGE) Data Center (DC-10) at Duluth Air Force Station.

The division and its subordinate interceptor, missile and radar units participated in numerous exercises such as Amalgam Fairplay, Feathered Indian, and Feathered Brave. In addition, its subordinate units exercised with surface to air missiles.  The scope of responsibility for the 23rd AD was expanded in 1973 with further ADCOM unit inactivations and consolidations to include the area south along the 88th meridian west to the 33rd parallel north, west to the 97th meridian west.  This added all of Missouri and Arkansas, as well as western Tennessee and northern Mississippi to the Division's Area of Responsibly.  It assumed additional designation 23rd ADCOM Region, 8 December 1978

In 1979 it was incorporated into Tactical Air Command with the inactivation of ADCOM as a major command.   Under Air Defense, Tactical Air Command (ADTAC) it continued its mission until 15 April 1982 when it moved to Tyndall Air Force Base, Florida and assumed responsibility for most of the region previously commanded by the inactivated 20th Air Division.

In 1985 most active-duty units were inactivated or reassigned to other missions, and the air defense mission came under Air Force Reserve and Air National Guard units under First Air Force.  The Division stood down on 1 July 1987, its command, mission, components, and assets were transferred to the ADTAC Southeast Air Defense Sector.

Lineage
 Established as the 23rd Air Division on 18 November 1969
 Activated on 19 November 1969
 Inactivated on 1 July 1987

Assignments
 Aerospace Defense Command, 19 November 1969
 Tactical Air Command, 1 October 1979
 First Air Force, 6 December 1985 – 1 July 1987

Components

Interceptor units
 1st Fighter Wing (Air Defense), 1 – 31 December 1969
 Selfridge Air Force Base, Michigan
 343rd Fighter Group (Air Defense), 19 November 1969 - 28 August 1970
 Duluth Airport, Minnesota

 2nd Fighter-Interceptor Squadron, 1 July 1971 - 31 March 1973
 Wurtsmith Air Force Base, Michigan
 94th Fighter-Interceptor Squadron, 1 December 1969 - 1 July 1971
 Wurtsmith Air Force Base, Michigan
 48th Fighter-Interceptor Squadron, 1 March 1983 - 1 July 1987
 Langley Air Force Base, Virginia

 62nd Fighter Interceptor Squadron, 19 November 1969 - 30 April 1971
 K. I. Sawyer Air Force Base, Michigan
 87th Fighter-Interceptor Squadron, 28 August 1970 - 1 August 1981
 K. I. Sawyer Air Force Base, Michigan

Missile units
 37th Air Defense Missile Squadron, 19 November 1969 - 31 July 1972
 Kincheloe Air Force Base, Michigan
 74th Air Defense Missile Squadron, 19 November 1969 - 30 April 1972
 Duluth Air Force Station, Minnesota

Radar units

 665th Air Defense Group, 1 March 1970 - 1 January 1974
 Calumet Air Force Station, Michigan
 692d Air Defense Group, 1 March 1970 - 1 January 1974
 Baudette Air Force Station, Minnesota
 661st Radar Squadron, 19 November 1969 - 1 July 1974
 Selfridge Air Force Base, Michigan
 665th Radar Squadron, 19 May 1969 - 1 March 1970
 Calumet Air Force Station, Michigan
 674th Radar Squadron, 19 November 1969 - 31 March 1975
 Osceola Air Force Station, Wisconsin
 676th Radar Squadron, 19 November 1969 - 30 June 1977
 Antigo Air Force Station, Wisconsin
 692nd Radar Squadron, 19 November 1969 - 1 March 1970
 Baudette Air Force Station, Minnesota

 739th Radar Squadron, 19 November 1969 - 30 September 1970
 Wadena Air Force Station, Minnesota
 752nd Radar Squadron, 19 November 1969 - 1 April 1978
 Empire Air Force Station, Michigan
 753rd Radar Squadron, 19 November 1969 - 30 October 1979
 Sault Sainte Marie Air Force Station, Michigan
 754th Radar Squadron, 19 November 1969 - 30 September 1988
 Port Austin Air Force Station, Michigan
 756th Radar Squadron, 19 November 1969 - 5 August 1980
 Finland Air Force Station, Minnesota
 701st Radar Squadron, 15 April 1982 - 30 June 1988
 Fort Fisher Air Force Station North Carolina

Stations
 Duluth International Airport, Minnesota, 19 November 1969
 Tyndall Air Force Base, Florida, 15 April 1982 – 1 July 1987

See also
 List of United States Air Force air divisions
 List of USAF Aerospace Defense Command General Surveillance Radar Stations
 Aerospace Defense Command Fighter Squadrons

References

Notes

Bibliography

  
 
 "ADCOM's Fighter Interceptor Squadrons". The Interceptor (January 1979) Aerospace Defense Command, (Volume 21, Number 1)

023
Military units and formations established in 1969
Military units and formations disestablished in 1987